Gunnison High School is a public high school located in Gunnison, Colorado.

History
The district's first high school was established in 1882, and it was officially named Gunnison High School in 1902. The current school building was built in 1965.

Demographics
The demographic breakdown of the 394 students enrolled in the 2019-20 school year was:
Male - 49.0%
Female - 51.0%
Asian - 0.8%
Hispanic - 21.1%
White - 75.9%
Multiracial - 2.2%
41 1% of the students were eligible for free or reduced-cost lunch.

Athletics
Gunnison's athletic teams are nicknamed the Cowboys and the school's colors are red and black. Gunnison teams compete in the following sports:

Baseball
Boys Golf
Boys Basketball
Cross Country
Football
Girls Basketball
Girls Golf
Mountain Biking
Rock Climbing
Swimming
Softball
Track & Field
Volleyball
Wrestling

State championships

Boys Track
2003 Colorado 3A State Champions
2005 Colorado 3A State Champions
Girls Cross Country
1997 Colorado 3A State Champions
Girls Track
1976 Colorado 2A State Champions
1991 Colorado 2A State Champions
1992 Colorado 2A State Champions
Wrestling
1964 Colorado 2A State Champions

References

External links

Public high schools in Colorado